On Her Majesty's Secret Service ("OHMSS") is the soundtrack for the James Bond film. It was composed, arranged, and conducted by John Barry; his fifth in the series.

Opening theme 
The opening theme for On Her Majesty's Secret Service proved challenging for composer John Barry. The convention in the previous James Bond films was to accompany the opening credits with a song whose lyrics included the film's title. This film became the first in the series since From Russia with Love to deviate from this rule (and From Russia with Love had differed only in featuring the song, sung by Matt Monro, at the end of the film rather than the beginning).

Barry felt it would be difficult to compose a theme song containing the title "On Her Majesty's Secret Service" unless it was written operatically, in the style of Gilbert and Sullivan. Leslie Bricusse had considered lyrics for the title song but director Peter R. Hunt allowed an instrumental opening title theme in the tradition of the first two Bond films.

The track is also notable for its use of the Moog synthesizer in its bassline. This instrument's distinctive sound would become a mainstay of other film soundtracks in the 1970s.

The opening theme, "On Her Majesty's Secret Service", also serves as an action theme alternate to Monty Norman's "James Bond Theme" - a piece of music which makes its last appearance in this film. Barry's arrangement of Norman's "James Bond Theme", first used in Dr. No in 1962, had been used throughout Sean Connery's tenure from 1962 to 1967, but since "On Her Majesty's Secret Service", the theme has been incorporated as a melody within each film's score, rather than as a standalone piece.

"On Her Majesty's Secret Service" was remixed in 1997 by the Propellerheads for the Shaken and Stirred: The David Arnold James Bond Project album.

Nic Raine, Barry's orchestrator, created an arrangement of the "Escape from Piz Gloria" sequence that was featured in a teaser trailer for Pixar's 2004 animated film The Incredibles. Notably, the performance of the piece used in the trailer was conducted by John Barry himself. (Barry had been asked to write the score for The Incredibles, but declined as he did not want to duplicate his older work.)

No Time to Die: Original Motion Picture Soundtrack contains references to two tracks from this soundtrack:
 We Have all the Time in the World (featured in "Matera");
 On Her Majesty's Secret Service Main Title (featured in "Good to Have You Back").

Songs 
Barry also composed the love song "We Have All the Time in the World" sung by Louis Armstrong, with lyrics by Hal David, Burt Bacharach's regular lyricist. "We Have All the Time in the World" is often mistakenly referred to as the opening credits theme, when in fact the song is played within the film, during the Bond–Tracy courtship montage, bridging Draco's birthday party in Portugal and Bond's burglary of the Gebrüder Gumbold law office in Bern, Switzerland. It is also heard during the short scene where Bond is in his office clearing his desk having just offered his resignation - also included in this musical cue are elements of "Under the Mango Tree" from Dr. No, the instrumental version of "From Russia With Love", and "Thunderball". "We Have All The Time In The World" was Armstrong's last recorded song (he died of a heart attack two years later), and at the time of release it barely made an impact on the charts.

Barry and David also wrote two other songs for the film, both performed by Danish singer Nina. One, entitled "Do You Know How Christmas Trees Are Grown?", was featured in the film in several scenes. The other, "The More Things Change", was recorded by Nina at the same session, but did not end up in the finished film. Instead, it appeared as the b-side of the UK single of "Do You Know How Christmas Trees Are Grown?" and an instrumental version of it appeared on John Barry's 1970 LP Ready When You Are J.B.

Track listing
Tracks 1–11 represent the original 1969 album presentation.
 "We Have All the Time in the World" – Louis Armstrong
 "This Never Happened to the Other Feller"
 "Try"
 "Ski Chase"
 "Do You Know How Christmas Trees Are Grown?" – Nina
 "On Her Majesty's Secret Service (Main Title)"
 "Journey to Blofeld's Hideaway"
 "We Have All the Time in the World (Instrumental)"
 "Over and Out"
 "Battle at Piz Gloria"
 "We Have All the Time in the World – James Bond Theme"
 "Journey to Draco's Hideaway"
 "Bond and Draco"
 "Gumbold's Safe"
 "Bond Settles In"
 "Bond Meets the Girls"
 "Dusk at Piz Gloria"
 "Sir Hilary's Night Out (Who Will Buy My Yesterdays?)"
 "Blofeld's Plot"
 "Escape from Piz Gloria"
 "Bobsled Chase"

In 2003, the soundtrack was digitally remastered and re-released with additional tracks (tracks 12 to 21); the liner notes state that these additional tracks contain "previously unreleased music within cue". Due to legal reasons, the additional tracks were placed after the tracks making up the original soundtrack. In both the original soundtrack and its re-release, the tracks are not in the chronological order in which they occur in the film.

Track listing (in chronological order, as they appear in the film)
 "This Never Happened to the Other Feller"
 "On Her Majesty's Secret Service (Main Title)"
 "Try"
 "Journey to Draco's Hideaway"
 Bond and Draco
 "We Have All the Time in the World" – Louis Armstrong
 "Gumbold's Safe"
 "Do You Know How Christmas Trees Are Grown?" – Nina
 "Journey to Blofeld's Hideaway"
 "Bond Settles In"
 "Bond Meets the Girls"
 "Sir Hilary's Night Out (Who Will Buy My Yesterdays?)"
 "Blofeld's Plot"
 "Escape from Piz Gloria"
 "Ski Chase"
 "Over and Out"
 "Battle at Piz Gloria"
 "Bobsled Chase"
 "We Have All the Time in the World – James Bond Theme"
 "We Have All the Time in the World (Instrumental)"
 "Dusk at Piz Gloria"

See also
 Outline of James Bond

References

Soundtrack albums from James Bond films
Soundtrack
1969 soundtrack albums
EMI Records soundtracks
John Barry (composer) soundtracks
Albums conducted by John Barry (composer)
Albums arranged by John Barry (composer)

cs:On Her Majesty's Secret Service